Christ Church, Sparkbrook is a church in the Anglican Diocese of Birmingham.

History

The original Christ Church building was opened in 1867. The spire was removed in 1918 and the tower taken down after damage by a blast in the Second World War. It was badly damaged in the 2005 Birmingham tornado and was subsequently demolished, despite a campaign by the Victorian Society to save it. A useful replacement building was dedicated in 2013, and a small but vibrant Christian community continues to meet there, serving the people of Sparkbrook.

References

Church of England church buildings in Birmingham, West Midlands
Churches completed in 1867